Milan Havel (born 7 August 1994) is a Czech professional footballer who plays as a midfielder for Viktoria Plzeň.

International career
He made his Czech Republic national football team debut on 8 September 2021 in a friendly against Ukraine, a 1–1 home draw.

Career statistics

Honours 
Bohemians 1905
Runner-up
 Czech National Football League: 2012–13

References

External links 
 
 
 
 

1994 births
People from Benešov
Living people
Czech footballers
Czech Republic youth international footballers
Czech Republic under-21 international footballers
Czech Republic international footballers
Association football midfielders
FC Viktoria Plzeň players
Czech First League players
Bohemians 1905 players
Sportspeople from the Central Bohemian Region